Penza Bicycle Plant was a company based in Penza, Russia.

The Penza Frunze Plant Production Association, founded in 1913, was once a major producer of ammunition fuses, and later became known for the production of bicycles. The company went bankrupt in 2016.

References

External links
 Official website (archive)

Companies based in Penza Oblast
Defunct manufacturing companies of Russia